The 2003–04 Lithuanian Hockey League season was the 13th season of the Lithuanian Hockey League, the top level of ice hockey in Lithuania. Six teams participated in the league, and SC Energija won the championship. SC Energija received a bye until the finals, as they played in the Latvian Hockey League.

Regular season

Final 
 SC Energija - Garsu Pausalis Vilnius 9:6

External links
Season on hockeyarchives.info

Lithuanian Hockey League
Lithuania Hockey League seasons
Lith